So Mi Like It is the debut extended play (EP) by Jamaican dancehall artist Spice, released as a digital download-only on 2 December 2014, by VP Records. The EP, which contains five tracks, was named after the single of the same name.

Track listing

Charts

Release history

References

External links
[ So Mi Like It] at AllMusic

2014 debut EPs
Spice (musician) albums
VP Records albums